"The One" (also titled "The 1") is a song by British rapper M.I.A. It was released on 26 May 2022, and is the lead single from her sixth studio album Mata.

Background 
Prior to the release of "The One", M.I.A. performed the song at Just Like Heaven festival on 21 May 2022 along with another upcoming MATA track "Marigold". She told Zane Lowe of Apple Music 1 in a live radio interview that the song "is just about sticking to what you are and the truth. I think, at the end of the day, that is also what this record is about to me, is still trying to find truth."

Charts

References 

2022 singles
2022 songs
M.I.A. (rapper) songs
Song recordings produced by T-Minus (record producer)
Songs written by M.I.A. (rapper)
Songs written by T-Minus (record producer)